Dahan is a surname. Notable people with the surname include:
Amy Dahan, French mathematician and historian of mathematics and climate change
Dudu Dahan, former Israeli football player
Mor Dahan, Israeli football player
Nissim Dahan, Israeli politician
Olivier Dahan, French film director and screenwriter
Theodosius V Dahan, 18th-century patriarch of Melkite Greek Catholic Church

Hebrew-language surnames